General Honoré Nabéré Traoré (born 28 September 1957) is a Burkinabé soldier who assumed leadership of Burkina Faso immediately after the resignation of Blaise Compaoré amidst the 2014 Burkinabé uprising. He served for one day, before he and other officials from the interim military administration declared Isaac Zida to be Head of State until power could be handed over to a civilian government that would oversee elections. 

Prior to entering national politics, Traoré had served as Compaoré's aide de camp.

References

Living people
Burkinabé military personnel
1957 births
People from Boucle du Mouhoun Region
21st-century Burkinabé people